Warren Miller may refer to:

Warren Miller (West Virginia congressman) (1847–1920)
Warren Miller (baseball) (1885–1956), outfielder in Major League Baseball
Warren Miller (author) (1921–1966), American writer
Warren Miller (political scientist) (1924–1999), American political scientist
Warren Miller (director) (1924–2018), American ski and snowboarding filmmaker
Warren Miller (ice hockey) (born 1954), American ice hockey player
Warren E. Miller (born 1964), Maryland politician
Warren L. Miller (fl. 1980s–2010s), former chairman of the U.S. Commission for the Preservation of America's Heritage Abroad
Warren F. Miller Jr. (born 1943), American nuclear engineer and government official
Warren Hastings Miller (1878–1960), American editor and author
Wes Miller (Warren Weston Miller; born 1983), American basketball coach and player
Warren Miller (Vermont politician) (fl. 2000s), member of the Vermont House of Representatives, 2005–2006 session
Warren H. Miller (fl. 1910s), managing editor of Field & Stream, 1910–1918